Michele Anaclerio (born 15 May 1982) is an Italian footballer who plays as a defender for Molfetta Calcio.

Career
A youth product of A.S. Bari, he made his Serie A debut on 27 May 2001 for Bari against Reggina Calcio, in Bari's third-last Serie A match of the season, since the club were in last place and had already mathematically been relegated.

On 30 March 2004, he played for the Serie B U21 Italian selection against Belgium U21.

In December 2017, Anaclerio joined Omnia Bitonto. After spells with Corato Calcio and U.S. Bitonto in Serie D, Anaclerio joined Molfetta Calcio at the end of August 2019.

References

External links
gazzetta.it

Italian footballers
Association football defenders
Footballers from Bari
1982 births
Living people
A.S. Bisceglie Calcio 1913 players
S.S.C. Bari players
S.S. Virtus Lanciano 1924 players
Piacenza Calcio 1919 players
Benevento Calcio players
Serie A players
Serie B players
Serie C players
Serie D players